Calvin "Cal" Fussman is an American journalist and author.  He is a Writer at Large for Esquire magazine, known for the What I've Learned column, where he interviews leaders in various fields, which have included Mikhail Gorbachev, Jimmy Carter, Ted Kennedy, Jeff Bezos, Richard Branson, Jack Welch, Robert De Niro, Clint Eastwood, Al Pacino, George Clooney, Leonardo DiCaprio, Tom Hanks, Bruce Springsteen, Dr. Dre, Quincy Jones, Woody Allen, Barbara Walters, Pelé, Yao Ming, Serena Williams, John Wooden, and Muhammad Ali.

Early life 
Cal Fussman was born in Brooklyn, New York. He grew up on Long Island and earned a bachelor's degree at The University of Missouri School of Journalism.

Career 
Fussman started his career as a sportswriter for The Miami Herald and The St. Louis Post-Dispatch, then moved to New York, where his work appeared in the magazines Inside Sports and Sports Illustrated. He learned how to interview on trains and buses, when he travelled around the world for 10 years and was constantly in conversation with people from all cultures and walks of life. Fussman's writing during this time and thereafter often revolved around quests.

Fussman began contributing to Esquire when David M. Granger took over as Editor in Chief in 1997. He became the lead interviewer for the magazine's "What I've Learned" column, in which people who have lived extraordinary lives discuss the wisdom they have accrued. Some the "What I've Learned" column, have  reissued in two books titled The Meaning of Life,. The Austin Chronicle has described Fussman's work in this format as "peerless" and "prolific".

Fussman has a chapter giving advice in Tim Ferriss' book Tools of Titans.

Awards
Fussman's story about his experience at Windows on the World won a James Beard Foundation Award for best personal essay in 2011.

Bibliography

Personal life 
Fussman is married to Gloria Paes, whom he met on a bus on the way to a beach in Brazil. The couple has three children and lives in Chapel Hill.

References

External links 
 Cal Fussman – Official Website
 Official Amazon.com Author Page – Books by Cal Fussman

Year of birth missing (living people)
Living people
American magazine writers
American sportswriters
Esquire (magazine) people
Jewish American writers
Writers from New York (state)
Missouri School of Journalism alumni